Qara Gol (also Romanized as Qarā Gol; also known as Gharagol) is a village in Sardaran Rural District, in the Central District of Kabudarahang County, Hamadan Province, Iran. At the 2006 census, its population was 950, in 223 families.

References 

Populated places in Kabudarahang County